Claudio Paolo Palmieri known professionally as Ethan Kath, is the co-founder and songwriter/producer for Crystal Castles and previously the bassist of Kïll Cheerleadër and Die Mannequin.

Rolling Stone named Crystal Castles icons of 20 Years of Lollapalooza. Kath and his band Crystal Castles received the John Peel Award For Innovation at the 2011 NME Awards. Crystal Castles' debut album was included in NME's "Top 100 Greatest Albums of the Decade" list at #39.

Biography
Kath was born to Italian parents in Toronto, Ontario. Prior to Crystal Castles, Kath played different instruments in many bands. At age 15, he played drums in Jakarta, an anarchist-hardcore band. Later, he was the bassist in a sleaze metal band called Kïll Cheerleadër. He was also in a two-piece folk band.

Crystal Castles were known for the elusiveness of their off-stage lives and identities. Kath was routinely photographed wearing hoodies which obscure some or all of his face and has gone by a number of different aliases over the years.

Sexual misconduct allegations
On October 24, 2017, Alice Glass posted a statement on her official website explaining her departure from Crystal Castles, accusing co-founder Ethan Kath of sexual, physical and mental abuse. The accusations detail the alleged abuse starting when Glass was 15 and began recording with Kath, and escalated until her eventual departure from Crystal Castles. Kath responded the same day in a statement issued to Pitchfork through his attorney, where he called the accusations "pure fiction" and said he was consulting with his lawyers as to his legal options. Kath subsequently sued Glass for defamation, which was dismissed in February 2018. Police Constable Allyson Douglas-Cook of the Toronto Police Service confirmed on December 21, 2017, that Palmieri was the subject of a currently open Sex Crimes unit investigation.

In an interview with The Daily Beast, Glass and four other women came forward alleging that Kath had sexually preyed on them when they were teenagers and he was in his mid to late twenties. With Kath using his fame in Crystal Castles and Kill Cheerleader to get in contact with them at a young age, the alleged victims stated that he took advantage of their naivety and supplied them with drugs and alcohol in order to coerce them into sexual acts.

Glass later gave an interview with The Guardian and further elaborated on Kath's behavior towards her, commenting that he had thrown her phone out of a moving car, torn her hair out, lied about the nature of her rib injury, and had at several points gone against doctor's orders and made her perform after she received a concussion. Kath also held onto Glass's passport and controlled her finances, preventing her from having her own cell phone or credit card until a couple of years before she left. Glass also mentioned that if she ever thought of leaving Crystal Castles, Kath would threaten to replace her with someone "who's a better singer and who would put up with a lot worse than [she] would". After discovering that Kath had done similar actions towards other women, Glass felt it was her responsibility to come forward.

Discography

With Kïll Cheerleadër 
 Gutter Days (2001)
 All Hail (2004)

With Die Mannequin 
 How To Kill (2006)

With Crystal Castles

 Crystal Castles (2008)
 Remixed Rewired (Bootleg) (2008)
 Crystal Castles (II) (2010)
 (III) (2012)
 Amnesty (I)'' (2016)

References

Living people
Canadian people of Italian descent
Chiptune musicians
Canadian songwriters
Canadian electronic musicians
Canadian experimental musicians
21st-century Canadian multi-instrumentalists
Noise musicians
Intelligent dance musicians
Canadian punk rock bass guitarists
Musicians from Toronto
21st-century Canadian keyboardists
21st-century Canadian bass guitarists
Masked musicians
Canadian record producers
Crystal Castles (band) members
Die Mannequin members
Canadian heavy metal bass guitarists
Remixers
Tracker musicians
Year of birth missing (living people)